Secondary cutaneous CD30+ large-cell lymphoma is a cutaneous condition that may arise in cases of mycosis fungoides, and in patients with lymphomatoid papulosis.

See also 
 Cutaneous T-cell lymphoma
 CD30+ cutaneous T-cell lymphoma
 Skin lesion
 List of cutaneous conditions

References 

Lymphoid-related cutaneous conditions
Lymphoma